The 1992 Chicago Bears season was their 73rd regular season completed in the National Football League (NFL). The Bears were looking to get back into the playoffs for a third straight year and improve on their 11–5 2nd place finish in the NFC Central Division. The Bears started the season with a 4–3 record but ended up losing eight of their remaining nine games, including six straight, and finished a disappointing 5–11. The Bears' poor record resulted in Head Coach Mike Ditka being fired on January 5, 1993 after eleven seasons. Dave Wannstedt, who was serving as the Dallas Cowboys' defensive coordinator, was hired to take his place. Ditka teams went 106–62, and made the playoffs in seven out of 11 seasons since 1982, including a win in Super Bowl XX in 1985, with what is considered the best defense of all time. He would return to coaching in 1997 as a head coach of the New Orleans Saints.

Additionally; this would mark the final season for future Hall of Fame middle linebacker Mike Singletary.

Offseason

NFL draft

Staff

Roster

Regular season

Schedule

Game summaries

Week 8: at Green Bay Packers 

 Source: Pro-Football-Reference.com

Week 15 vs Steelers 

Mike Singletary's final home game

Standings

References

External links 

 1992 Chicago Bears at Pro-Football-Reference.com

Chicago Bears
Chicago Bears seasons
Bear
1990s in Chicago
1992 in Illinois